Pokhvistnevsky District is an administrative and municipal district (raion), one of the twenty-seven in Samara Oblast, Russia. It is located in the northeast of the oblast. Its administrative center is the town of Pokhvistnevo (which is not administratively a part of the district). Population: 29,027 (2010 Census);

Administrative and municipal status
Within the framework of administrative divisions, Pokhvistnevsky District is one of the twenty-seven in the oblast. The town of Pokhvistnevo serves as its administrative center, despite being incorporated separately as a town of oblast significance—an administrative unit with the status equal to that of the districts.

As a municipal division, the district is incorporated as Pokhvistnevsky Municipal District. The town of oblast significance of Pokhvistnevo is incorporated separately from the district as Pokhvistnevo Urban Okrug.

References

Notes

Sources

Districts of Samara Oblast
